Tetraphenylporphyrin, abbreviated TPP or H2TPP, is a synthetic heterocyclic compound that resembles naturally occurring porphyrins.  Porphyrins are dyes and cofactors found in hemoglobin and cytochromes and are related to chlorophyll and vitamin B12.  The study of naturally occurring porphyrins is complicated by their low symmetry and the presence of polar substituents.  Tetraphenylporphyrin is hydrophobic, symmetrically substituted, and easily synthesized.  The compound is a dark purple solid that dissolves in nonpolar organic solvents such as chloroform and benzene.

Synthesis and structure
Tetraphenylporphyrin was first synthesized in 1935 by Rothemund, who caused benzaldehyde and pyrrole to react in a sealed bomb at 150 °C for 24 h. Adler and Longo modified the Rothemund method by allowing benzaldehyde and pyrrole to react for 30 min in refluxing propionic acid (141 °C) open to the air:
8 C4H4NH  +  8 C6H5CHO  + 3 O2   →  2 (C6H5C)4(C4H2N)2(C4H2NH)2  +  14 H2O
Despite its modest yields, the synthesis of H2TPP is a common experiment in university teaching labs.  Highly efficient routes to H2TPP and many analogues involve the air-free condensation of the pyrrole and aldehyde to give the porphyrinogen. In this so-called Lindsey synthesis of meso-substituted porphyrins, the porphyrinogen is subsequently oxidized to deliver the porphyrin.

The conjugate base of the porphyrin, TPP2−, belongs to the symmetry group D4h while its hydrogenated counterpart H2(TPP) is D2h.  Unlike natural porphyrins, H2TPP is substituted at the oxidatively sensitive "meso" carbon positions, and hence the compound is sometimes called meso-tetraphenylporphyrin.  Another synthetic porphyrin, octaethylporphyrin (H2OEP) does have a substitution pattern that is biomimetic.  Many derivatives of TPP and OEP are known, including those prepared from substituted benzaldehydes.  One of the first functional analogues of myoglobin was the ferrous derivative of the "picket fence porphyrin," which is structurally related to Fe(TPP), being derived via the condensation of 2-nitrobenzaldehyde and pyrrole.

Sulfonated derivatives of TPP are also well known to give water-soluble derivatives, e.g. tetraphenylporphine sulfonate:
4 SO3  + (C6H5C)4(C4H2N)2(C4H2NH)2
→   (HO3SC6H4C)4(C4H2N)2(C4H2NH)2  +  4 H2O

Complexes

Complexation can be thought of as proceeding via the conversion of H2TPP to TPP2−, with 4-fold symmetry.  The metal insertion process proceeds via several steps, not via the dianion.  Representative complexes:
Cu(TPP)  
Zn(TPP)Lx  
VO(TPP)
Fe(TPP)Cl

Optical properties

Tetraphenylporphyrin has a strong absorption band with maximum at 419 nm (so called Soret band) and four weak bands with maxima at 515, 550, 593 and 649 nm (so called Q-bands). It shows red fluorescence with maxima at 649 and 717 nm. The quantum yield is 11%.
Soret red shifts for Zn(TTP)-Donor systems relative to the Soret band at 416.2 nm for Zn(TTP) in cyclohexane have been measured.

Applications

H2TPP is a photosensitizer for the production of singlet oxygen. Its molecules have potential applications in single-molecule electronics, as they show diode-like behavior that can be altered for each individual molecule.

References

Chelating agents
Tetrapyrroles
Macrocycles
Phenyl compounds